Jonathan C. Kirk (October 21, 1836 - July 30, 1907) was a Union Army soldier in the American Civil War who received the U.S. military's highest decoration, the Medal of Honor.

Kirk was born in Clinton County, Ohio, and he entered service in Wilmington, Ohio. Kirk was awarded the Medal of Honor, for his actions at the Battle of North Anna on May 23, 1864 when he single-handedly captured 13 armed Confederate Army soldiers as a captain with Company F, 20th Indiana Infantry.

His Medal of Honor was issued on April 6, 1865.

Medal of Honor citation

References

External links

1836 births
1907 deaths
American Civil War recipients of the Medal of Honor
Burials in Kansas
People from Clinton County, Ohio
People of Ohio in the American Civil War
Union Army officers
United States Army Medal of Honor recipients